The Nissan Heritage Collection is a private car gallery located in the Nissan engine manufacturing plant in Zama, Kanagawa, Japan.

History
The Zama facility, where the collection is housed, used to be Nissan's most advanced assembly facility when it opened in the 1960s. It was previously housed in Nissan's Oppama and was also known as the Nissan DNA Museum.

Up until 2013–2014, the collection was entirely private, with no public access whatsoever. By 2018, it had welcomed a total of 15.000 visitors.

Description
The museum focuses on restoration and safekeeping of Datsun, Prince and Nissan cars, and is curated by former Nissan career employees. The facility houses more than 450 cars dating as far back as the 1930s. 70% of the cars in the collection are in drivable condition. 300 cars are on permanent display. The exhibition is curated by David Bishop, Senior Manager at Nissan.

Visits to the facility are limited. Visitors must register for a visit online and wait for an approval. Visits last about 80 minutes. On weekdays, the engine of some cars are turned on for visitors to enjoy the revving acoustics of the motors.

This facility works closely with the Nissan Headquarters Gallery, located in Minato Mirai 21 district, Yokohama, and some cars from the collection are displayed in the gallery on periodical rotation.

There is also a Nissan Heritage Collection in the basement of the Lane Motor Museum in Nashville, Tennessee. The Nissan Engine Museum is located in Yokohama.

Models exhibited
Datsun 12 Phaeton 1936
Datsun Type 15 1936
Tama Electric Car 1947
Prince Skyline Deluxe 1957
Prince Skyline Sport 1962
Prince R380-I (n°11) - Prince R380-II
Skyline GT-R 1969
Silvia 1965
S30 Fairlady Z 1969
Sunny B110 1970
R390 Le Mans
R390 GT1

References

External links
 Official website

Year of establishment missing
Automobile museums in Japan
Nissan
Private collections in Asia
Zama, Kanagawa
Museums in Kanagawa Prefecture